PS Ireland was a paddle-wheel steamship of the White Star Line, built in 1891. Together with her sister ship , she tendered the various White Star Liners which came through the port of Queenstown, Ireland (now Cobh).

Ireland brought Irish immigrants to the Titanic, followed by America, who brought 123 passengers. On 19 April 1912, following the sinking of the Titanic, Ireland and America's White Star Line flags were flown at half-mast.

During World War I in 1918, she was used as a mine sweeper.

Ireland was scrapped in April 1928.

References

Paddle steamers
1891 ships